Kernel Language 0 (KL0) is a sequential logic programming language based on Prolog, used in the ICOT Fifth generation computer project.

References

 

Prolog programming language family
Japanese inventions